The siege of Royan (French: Siège de Royan) was a siege accomplished by the young French king Louis XIII in 1622, against the Protestant stronghold of Royan. This siege followed the siege of Montauban, in which Louis XIII had failed against the Huguenot city.

The siege started at the beginning of May 1622. After 6 days, despite support from La Rochelle, the city surrendered, the defenders obtaining to withdraw to La Rochelle with weapons and luggage, although they had to leave cannons and ammunition.

See also
 French Wars of Religion
 Huguenot rebellions

Notes

1622 in France
Royan, Siege of
Royan
History of Charente-Maritime
Conflicts in 1622
Huguenot rebellions